Douglas Ross Hyde  (17 January 1860 – 12 July 1949), known as , was an Irish academic, linguist, scholar of the Irish language, politician and diplomat who served as the first President of Ireland from June 1938 to June 1945. He was a leading figure in the Gaelic revival, and the first President of the Gaelic League, one of the most influential cultural organisations in Ireland at the time.

Background

Hyde was born at Longford House in Castlerea, County Roscommon, while his mother, Elizabeth (née Oldfield; 1834–1886), was on a short visit. His father, Arthur Hyde, whose family were originally from Castlehyde, Fermoy, County Cork, was Church of Ireland rector of Kilmactranny, County Sligo, from 1852 to 1867, and it was here that Hyde spent his early years. Arthur Hyde and Elizabeth Oldfield married in County Roscommon, in 1852, and had three other children: Arthur Hyde (1853–79 in County Leitrim), John Oldfield Hyde (1854–96 in County Dublin), and Hugh Hyde (1856).

In 1867, his father was appointed prebendary and rector of Tibohine, and the family moved to neighbouring Frenchpark, in County Roscommon. He was home schooled by his father and his aunt due to a childhood illness. While a young man, he became fascinated with hearing the old people in the locality speak the Irish language. He was influenced in particular by the gamekeeper Séamus Hart and his friend's wife, Mrs. Connolly. Aged 14, Hyde was devastated when Hart died, and his interest in the Irish language—the first language he began to study in any detail, as his own undertaking—flagged for a while. However, he visited Dublin a number of times and realised that there were groups of people, just like him, interested in Irish, a language looked down on at the time by many and seen as backward and old-fashioned.

Rejecting family pressure that, like past generations of Hydes, he would follow a career as an Anglican clergyman, Hyde instead became an academic. He entered Trinity College Dublin, where he became fluent in French, Latin, German, Greek and Hebrew, graduating in 1884 as a moderator in modern literature. A medallist of the College Historical Society, he was elected its president in 1931. His passion for the language revival of Irish, which was already in severe decline, led him to help found the Gaelic League, or in Irish, in 1893.

Hyde married German-born but British-raised Lucy Kurtz in 1893. The couple had two daughters, Nuala and Úna.

Conradh na Gaeilge/Gaelic League

Hyde joined the Society for the Preservation of the Irish Language around 1880, and between 1879 and 1884, he published more than a hundred pieces of Irish verse under the pen name .

Initially derided, the Irish language movement gained a mass following. Hyde helped establish the Gaelic Journal in 1892; in November, he wrote a manifesto called The necessity for de-anglicising the Irish nation, arguing that Ireland should follow its own traditions in language, literature and dress.

In 1893, he helped found Conradh na Gaeilge (the Gaelic League) to encourage the preservation of Irish culture, music, dance and language. A new generation of Irish republicans (including Pádraig Pearse, Éamon de Valera, Michael Collins and Ernest Blythe), became politicised through their involvement in Conradh na Gaeilge. Hyde filled out the 1911 census form in Irish.

Uncomfortable at the growing politicisation of the movement, Hyde resigned the presidency in 1915. He was succeeded by the League's co-founder Eoin MacNeill.

Senator

Hyde had no association with Sinn Féin and the independence movement. He was elected to Seanad Éireann, the upper house of the Irish Free State's Oireachtas (parliament), at a by-election on 4 February 1925, replacing Sir Hutcheson Poë.

In the 1925 Seanad election, Hyde placed 28th of the 78 candidates, with 19 seats available. The Catholic Truth Society opposed him for his Protestantism and publicised his supposed support for divorce. Historians have suggested that the CTS campaign was ineffective, and that Irish-language advocates performed poorly, with all those endorsed by the Gaelic League losing.

He returned to academia as Professor of Irish at University College Dublin, where one of his students was future Attorney General of Ireland, Chief Justice of Ireland and President of Ireland, Cearbhall Ó Dálaigh.

President of Ireland

Nomination

In April 1938, by now retired from academia, Hyde was plucked from retirement by Taoiseach Éamon de Valera and again appointed to Seanad Éireann. Again his tenure proved short, even shorter than before; however, this time it was because Hyde was chosen, after inter-party negotiations—following an initial suggestion by Fine Gael—to be the first President of Ireland, to which office he was elected unopposed. He was selected for a number of reasons:

Both the Taoiseach, Éamon de Valera, and the Leader of the Opposition, W. T. Cosgrave, admired him;
Both wanted a President with universal prestige to lend credibility to the new office, especially since the new 1937 Constitution made it unclear whether the President or the British monarch was the official head of state;
Both wanted to purge the humiliation that had occurred when Hyde lost his Senate seat in 1925;
Both wanted a President who would prove there was no danger that the holder of the office would become an authoritarian dictator, a widespread fear when the new constitution was being discussed in 1937;
Both wanted to pay tribute to Hyde's role in promoting the Irish language.
Both wanted to choose a non-Catholic to disprove the assertion that the State was a "confessional state", although on 11 May 1937 Seán MacEntee, the Fianna Fáil Minister of Finance, had described the 1937 Constitution in Dáil Éireann as "the Constitution of a Catholic State".

Inauguration

Hyde was inaugurated as the first President of Ireland, on 26 June 1938. The Irish Times reported it as follows:

Hyde set a precedent by reciting the Presidential Declaration of Office in Irish. His recitation, in Roscommon Irish, is one of a few recordings of a dialect of which Hyde was one of the last speakers. Upon inauguration, he moved into the long-vacant Viceregal Lodge in Phoenix Park, since known as Áras an Uachtaráin.

Hyde's selection and inauguration received worldwide media attention and was covered by newspapers in Australia, New Zealand, South Africa, Argentina, and even Egypt. Hitler "ordered" the Berlin newspapers "to splash" on the Irish presidential installation ceremony. However, the British government ignored the event. The Northern Ireland Finance Minister, J. M. Andrews, described Hyde's inauguration as a "slight on the King" and "a deplorable tragedy".

Presidency

Despite being placed in a position to shape the office of the presidency via precedent, Hyde by and large opted for a quiet, conservative interpretation of the office. His age and health obligated him to schedule periods of rest throughout his days, and his lack of political experience caused him to defer to his advisers on questions of policy and discretionary powers, especially to his Secretary, Michael McDunphy. On 13 November 1938, just months after Hyde's inauguration, Hyde attended an international soccer match between Ireland and Poland at Dalymount Park in Dublin. This was seen as breaching the GAA's ban on 'foreign games' and he was subsequently removed as patron of the GAA, an honour he had held since 1902.

After a massive stroke in April 1940, plans were made for his lying-in-state and state funeral. However, Hyde survived, albeit paralysed and having to use a wheelchair.

Although the role of is largely ceremonial, the president has the authority under the Constitution to refuse to grant a dissolution of the Dáil where the Taoiseach has ceased to retain the support of a majority of the Dáil, and to refer legislation to the Supreme Court before signing it into law.

Hyde was confronted with a crisis in 1944, when de Valera's government unexpectedly collapsed in a vote on the Transport Bill and the President had to decide whether or not to grant a dissolution of the Dáil. If a dissolution is granted, a general election is proclaimed to fill the seats thereby vacated. This means that for four to six weeks, until the new Dáil assembles, there is no Dáil. Fearing this gap might facilitate an invasion during World War II, during which no parliament could be called upon to act, the Oireachtas enacted the General Elections (Emergency Powers) Act 1943, legislation under the emergency provisions of Article 28.3.3°), which allowed an election to be called separate from a dissolution, with the Dáil only being dissolved just before new Dáil would assemble. This ensured the gap between Dála (plural of Dáil) would be too short to cause a vacuum in major decision-making. Under the Act the President could "refuse to proclaim a general election on the advice of a Taoiseach who had ceased to retain the support of a majority in Dáil Éireann". Hyde had that option but, after considering it with his senior advisor Michael McDunphy, he opted to grant de Valera his election request.

Hyde twice used his power under Article 26 of the Constitution, having consulted the Council of State, to refer a Bill or part of a Bill to the Supreme Court, for the court's decision on whether the Bill or part referred is repugnant to the Constitution (so that the Bill in question cannot be signed into law). On the first occasion, the court held that the Bill referred – Offences Against the State (Amendment) Bill 1940 – was not repugnant to the Constitution. In response to the second reference, the Court decided that the particular provision referred – section 4 of the School Attendance Bill 1942 – was repugnant to the Constitution. Because of Article 34.3.3° of the Constitution, the constitutional validity of the Offences Against the State (Amendment) Act, 1940 cannot be challenged in any court, since the Bill which became that Act was found by the Supreme Court not to be repugnant in the context of an Article 26 reference.

One of Hyde's last presidential acts was a visit to the German Ambassador Eduard Hempel, on 3 May 1945, to offer his formal condolences on the death of Adolf Hitler. The visit remained a secret until 2005.

Retirement and death

Hyde left office on 25 June 1945, opting not to nominate himself for a second term. Owing to his ill-health he did not return to his Roscommon home, Ratra, empty since the death of his wife early in his term. He moved into the former residence of the Secretary to the Lord Lieutenant, in the grounds of Áras an Uachtaráin, which he renamed Little Ratra, where he lived out the remaining four years of his life. He died at 10pm on 12 July 1949, aged 89.

State funeral

As a former President of Ireland, Hyde was accorded a state funeral. As a member of the Church of Ireland, his funeral service took place in Dublin's Church of Ireland St. Patrick's Cathedral. However, contemporary rules of the Roman Catholic Church in Ireland prohibited its members from attending services in non-Catholic churches. As a result, all but one member of the Catholic cabinet, Noël Browne, remained outside the cathedral grounds while the funeral service took place. They then joined the cortège when his coffin left the cathedral. Éamon de Valera, by now Leader of the Opposition, also did not attend. He was represented instead by a senior Fianna Fáil figure who was a member of the Church of Ireland, Erskine H. Childers, a future President of Ireland himself. Hyde was buried in Frenchpark, County Roscommon at Portahard Church, (where he had spent most of his childhood life) beside his wife Lucy, his daughter Nuala, his sister Annette, mother Elizabeth and father Arthur.

In memoriam

References

External links

Biography at Áras an Uachtaráin website
Oireachtas Members Database – Profile
Dunleavy, Janet Egleson and Gareth W. Dunleavy. Douglas Hyde: A Maker of Modern Ireland. Berkeley et al.: Univ. of California Press, 1991. Available from eScholarship.
Hyde, Douglas. The Love Songs of Connacht: Being the Fourth Chapter of the Songs of Connacht. Dundrum, Ireland: Dun Emer Press, 1904. Available from Google Books.
 
 
 
 

1860 births
1949 deaths
Academics of University College Dublin
Alumni of Trinity College Dublin
19th-century Anglo-Irish people
20th-century Anglo-Irish people
Celtic studies scholars
Conradh na Gaeilge people
Independent members of Seanad Éireann
Irish Anglicans
Irish folklorists
Irish language activists
Irish-language writers
Irish poets
Members of the 1922 Seanad
Members of the 2nd Seanad
Nominated members of Seanad Éireann
Patrons of the Gaelic Athletic Association
People from Castlerea
People from County Sligo
Presidents of Ireland